Shumbulta or Šumbulta is the eighth month of the Mandaean calendar. Light fasting is practiced by Mandaeans from the 26th to 30th days of Shumbulta. The Parwanaya, or five intercalary days, take place immediately after Shumbulta.

Šumbulta, which literally means 'grain-ear', is the Mandaic name for the constellation Virgo. It currently corresponds to Feb / Mar in the Gregorian calendar due to a lack of a leap year in the Mandaean calendar.

References

Months of the Mandaean calendar
Virgo in astrology